God's Stepson is an album by hip hop producer 9th Wonder (formerly one third of the group Little Brother).  It was an unofficial remix of Nas's God's Son album of 2002.

Background
Released through internet outlets in 2003, the album began the trend for homemade remix projects, which reached fever pitch with Jay-Z's The Black Album remixes (of which 9th also submitted an entry). It was well received by critics and fans alike for its re-interpretation of what many considered to be a return-to-form album from Nas. In particular, the album is responsible for popularizing remixes of whole albums back-to-front, and also for establishing 9th Wonder amongst the premier league of hip hop producers.

9th Wonder didn't create the mix with a view to generate a buzz or promote his skills saying, "I didn't even think anybody was going to hear it". When asked by HitQuarters what inspired the remix he said: "I think all of us at one point want to hear Nas on something different. His voice is like another instrument on a track."

The album was excellently received, and served as the a catalyst for 9th, sweeping "the industry off their feet".

Track listing
 "Get Down"
 "The Cross"
 "Made You Look"
 "Last Real Nigga Alive"
 "Hey Nas"
 "I Can"
 "Book Of Rhymes"
 "Thugz Mansion (NYC)"
 "Mastermind"
 "Warrior Song"
 "Revolutionary Warfare"
 "Ether" (Originally from Stillmatic)

Samples
"Get Down" contains a sample from "You're a Friend of Mine" by The Meters
"The Cross" contains a sample from "Beautiful Man of Mine" by Phyllis Hyman
"Made U Look" outro contains a sample from "Broken Wing Bird" by The 5th Dimension
"Last Real Nigga Alive" contains a sample from "Moves" by Doug Hammond
"Hey Nas" contains a sample from "I'd Like To Be Baby To You" by Roberta Flack
"I Can" contains a sample from "Break It Down" by Curtis Mayfield
"Book Of Rhymes" contains a sample from "You'll Always Be Mine" by The Impressions
"Thugz Mansion (NYC)" contains a sample from "It's Madness" by Marvin Gaye
"Mastermind" contains a sample from "Scarborough Fair" by Sérgio Mendes
"Revolutionary Warfare" contains a sample from "Let Me Make Love To You" by The O'Jays
"Ether" contains a sample from "Hey, What's That You Say" by Brother To Brother

References

9th Wonder albums
Albums produced by 9th Wonder
2003 remix albums
Nas
Unofficial remix albums